Greccio is an old hilltown and comune of the province of Rieti in the Italian region of Lazio, overhanging the Rieti valley on a spur of the Monti Sabini, a sub-range of the Apennines, about  by road northwest of Rieti, the nearest large town.

The actual town of Greccio has been depopulating, and the administrative functions of the comune are now in the frazione of Limiti di Greccio.

History
Greccio was founded as a Greek colony. They had fled or were exiled from their homeland as a result of war.  They settled here for the natural protection it offered. Hence the name Greece, Grece, Grecce, and finally Greccio. The earliest records date back to the Tenth and Eleventh centuries. The Benedictine Monk, Gregory of Catino (1062-1133) refers to the town of Greccio (curte de Greccia) in his work "Summary Farfense". From the remains of the ancient buildings, it shows that Greccio became a fortified medieval castle surrounded by walls and protected by a six towers fortress.
 
During the struggle with neighboring cities, the castle was destroyed in 1242 by the troops of Frederick II. They had a difficult history until 1799 when the town was destroyed and looted by the Napoleonic army.

Greccio was the place where, in December 1223, St. Francis devised the first living crib (in Italian: presepe). The idea was to discourage would-be pilgrims from going to Bethlehem, as it was a risky venture, the Holy Land being then under the control of the Turks. The tradition continues there to this day, and a memorial of St. Francis, the Santuario di S. Francesco, may be visited.

Location
The village is surrounded by an oak forests. Here, St. Francis of Assisi, would retire in prayer and meditation in a hut protected by two hornbeam plants. In this same place, in 1792, by popular demand, it was built a memorial chapel dedicated to him, "the chapel".

The medieval village that preserves part of the pavement of the old castle (Eleventh Century) and three of the six towers. The parish church of San Michele Archangel is located next to the bell tower on top of a flight of steps and dates back to the fourteenth century. The church was built over a part of the castle.  The church was destroyed and rebuilt several times. The church as a Nave and side chapels. Two of the side chapels, dedicated to St. Anthony of Padua and Our Lady Immaculate have paintings and frescoes of the Fifteenth and Sixteenth century. In the square, there is the Church of Santa Maria del Giglio from 1400.   This church also is a single aisle or Nave. It has a central altar and two side altars, stucco Roman school with influences of Carlo Fontana. The high altar preserves, a fresco, which represents the Virgin and Child with Angels.

The town contains the ruined church of Santa Maria, now restored as the International Museum of the Crib, the remains of the ancient towers, one of the entrance doors, the chapel dedicated to St. Francis, with the stone on which he used up to preach, and the place where, according to tradition, was launched firebrand who made public the place designated for the construction of the Sanctuary.

Saint Francis

Francis, recalling a visit he had made years before to Bethlehem, resolved to create the manger he had seen there. The ideal spot was a cave in nearby Greccio. He would find a baby, hay upon which to lay him, an ox, and an ass to stand beside the manger. Word went out to the people of the town. At the appointed time, they arrived carrying torches and candles. One of the friars began celebrating Mass while Francis himself gave the sermon. His biographer, Thomas of Celano, recalls that Francis stood before the manger, overwhelmed with love and filled with a wonderful happiness. For Francis, the simple celebration was meant to recall the hardships Jesus suffered even as an infant, a savior who chose to become poor for our sake, a truly human Jesus.

Transport 
Greccio has a station on the Terni–Sulmona railway, with trains to Terni, Rieti and L'Aquila.

Twin towns - sister cities
Greccio is twinned with:
 Bethlehem, Palestine

References

Bibliography
Prof. Francesco Benedetti; Greccio - From the castrum to the present day: a thousand-year journey in the sign of the presence of Francis of Assisi - 2007
Arch. Marcello Mari; In the spirit of St. Francis - 2006

External links

The Pro Loco of Greccio

Cities and towns in Lazio
Hilltowns in Lazio
History of Italy